"Lavatory Love Machine" is a single taken from German power metal band Edguy's album Hellfire Club.

Track listing
 "Lavatory Love Machine" - 4:24
 "Lavatory Love Machine" (Acoustic) - 4:35
 "I'll Cry for You" (Europe cover) - 3:45
 "Reach Out" - 4:05

The disc also contains a video clip of "Lavatory Love Machine."

Personnel
Tobias Sammet - Lead vocals
Tobias 'Eggi' Exxel - Bass Guitar
Jens Ludwig - Lead Guitar
Dirk Sauer - Rhythm  Guitar
Felix Bohnke - Drums
Frank Tischer - Piano on 'Reach Out'

Info
Except for the title track, all songs will be exclusive to this single.
In Germany, the single was also available as a strictly limited digipak version with a pressing of 3.000 copies.
Track 1-3 also appear on the compilation album The Singles.
The Single peaked at #46 in the Swedish singles chart.

References

2004 singles
Edguy songs
2004 songs
Nuclear Blast Records singles